Mugavaree is a 2000 Indian Tamil-language musical romantic drama film written and directed by V. Z. Durai and produced by S. S. Chakravarthy. The film stars Ajith Kumar and Jyothika, with Raghuvaran, Vivek, Manivannan, and K. Viswanath playing supporting roles. It was Ajith's first film of the new 2000s millennium. The music is composed by Deva, song lyrics were written by Vairamuthu, whilst the film featured award-winning cinematography by P. C. Sriram.

The story revolves around the conflicting emotions of ambition, love and responsibility that Sridhar (Ajith Kumar) goes through in his quest to become a successful music composer. The film was released on 19 February 2000 and became a commercial success, winning two Tamil Nadu State Film Awards: Best Family Film and Best Choreographer (Brindha).

Plot
Sridhar is from a middle-class family headed by his father. Shiva is Sridhar's elder brother and the breadwinner for the family, consisting of his wife Shantha and sister. Sridhar, upon completion of his graduation, aspires to become a music composer and tries hard to secure a chance in movies, but all his efforts go in vain. Sridhar's search for a chance continues for eight years. Despite that, his family members support him very well and encourage him whenever he feels dejected.

Sridhar meets and befriends Viji Chandrasekhar. Viji also likes Sridhar and his aspiration. Slowly, love blossoms between them. Viji gets introduced to Sridhar's family, and they too like her. However, Sridhar has plans of marrying her only after getting his first break in music. Viji also understands Sridhar and supports him. A CD shop owner is Sridhar's neighbour, and he also encourages him. Sridhar gets an opportunity to compose music for a film. He feels extremely happy and goes for recording. However, on the same day, the producer meets with an accident, and as he considers it an inauspicious sign, the film is dropped.

Viji's younger sister Sudha gets a good marriage alliance, but the groom's family finds it odd upon seeing Viji being unmarried. Viji's father requests Sridhar and Viji to get married so that it does not stop his younger daughter's wedding proposal. Viji's father asks Sridhar to leave away his dream of becoming a music composer as he has been already trying hard for years. He also offers him a job so that he can marry Viji.

However, Sridhar refuses to let go his dream. He is ready to sacrifice his love for the sake of his ambition. He requests Viji to marry someone else as he cannot give up his passion for music. One day, Shiva has a heart attack and is admitted to the hospital. The doctors say that Shiva has heart problems and needs rest. Sridhar is shocked to see his brother's condition. As Shiva was the only income earner in the family, now Shantha and Preitha decide to take up some jobs to help earn money for the family.

Sridhar worries seeing that, though he also feels proud about the love and affection shown by his family members towards him, as no one asked him to forego his ambition and take up some job despite this condition. However, Sridhar decides to go for a job so he could ease his family's financial burden. He informs this to the CD shop owner and leaves for an interview, giving up his ambition. After a few years, Sridhar secures a chance to compose music, becomes a leading music composer and marries Viji.

Cast

 Ajith Kumar as Sridhar
 Jyothika as Viji Chandrasekhar
 Raghuvaran as Shiva
 K. Viswanath as Sridhar's father
 Sithara as Shantha
 Vivek as Ramesh
 Manivannan as the CD Shop Owner
 Jai Ganesh as Chandrasekhar
 Fathima Babu as Viji's mother
 Suchindra as Durai (guest appearance)
 Nizhalgal Ravi as Dhurai's father
 Preetha as Sridhar's sister
 Soumya as Sudha
 Rajeev as Shiva's friend
 Cochin Hanifa as Music Director
 Ponnambalam as Muthupandi
 Mohan Raman as Shiva's boss
 Santhana Bharathi as RK Ram
 Sethu Vinayagam as Cinema Producer
 S. Kavitha as Viji's friend
 Rajasekhar
 Scissor Manohar
 Master Mahendran as a child on the beach
 Kanal Kannan  (special appearance)

Production
The film director, V. Z. Durai, revealed that he had approached S. S. Chakravarthy to make the film with Ajith Kumar after failing to get noticed for a long period, getting rejected by four producers for the script. Chakravarthy was supportive and maintained a close link with the film from shoot till post-production.

Soundtrack 
The film's score and soundtrack was composed by Deva, with lyrics written by Vairamuthu. "Oh... Nenje" is based on "Get Down (You're the One for Me)" by the Backstreet Boys, "Poo Virinjachu" is based on "That Thing You Do!" from the film of the same name, and "Keechu Kiliye" is based on "Enemies" by Dr. Alban.

Release and reception
The film was released on 19 February 2000. Indolink said that "Durai's presentation and supporting characters lack the depth necessary to make this a commercially successful venture". Shobha Warrier of Rediff.com also gave the film a positive review citing that the real "winners" are "Ajith, the actor, and P. C. Sriram, the cinematographer". The critic claimed that Ajith Kumar "brilliantly portrays the vulnerable and sad Sridhar". Tamil Star Online said, "Though the theme is familiar the treatment is certainly upbeat which makes 'Mugavari' a meaningful film".

The initial climax showed the character of Sridhar facing another roadblock on his journey towards becoming a music composer. Post-release, the climax was changed following demand from audiences, showed a more favourable situation for Sridhar. The film went on to win the second prize for Tamil Nadu State Film Award for Best Family Film, whilst Brindha won Tamil Nadu State Film Award for Best Choreographer for her work in the film's songs.

References

External links
 

2000 directorial debut films
2000 films
2000 romantic drama films
2000s Tamil-language films
Films directed by V. Z. Durai
Films scored by Deva (composer)
Indian romantic drama films